Alexandrine von Taxis (1 August 1589 – 26 December 1666), was a German noblewoman who served as Imperial General Postmaster of the Kaiserliche Reichspost, the General Post Office of the Holy Roman Empire, as well as the Post Master of the Spanish Netherlands, from 1628 until 1646.

Early life
She was born as the second child and only daughter of Philibert de Rye, Count de Varax (d. 1597) and Claudine de Tournon-Roussillon (d. 1586), daughter of Claudine de la Tour-Turenne.

Marriage and issue
She was married to Count Leonhard II von Taxis (1594-1628). When he died, she took over his office until her son Lamoral II Claudius Franz, Count of Thurn and Taxis was old enough and educated enough to take office. She and her husband were progenitors of the House of Thurn und Taxis.

See also
 Gese Wechel, Swedish equivalent 
 Dorothea Krag, Danish equivalent

References
 Wolfgang Behringer, Thurn und Taxis. Piper, München/Zürich 1990, .

17th-century German businesspeople
1589 births
1666 deaths
German postmasters
Princesses of Thurn und Taxis
17th-century civil servants
Postmasters-General